Rambures is a commune in the Somme department in Hauts-de-France in northern France.

Geography

Apples of the variety named Rambour originated here.

Population

Places of interest
 The Château de Rambures, an unusual fortress, being built almost entirely of bricks, the only example of its kind in Picardie. Its park contains a rose garden and remarkable trees (Parc et Roseraie du Château de Rambures).

See also
Communes of the Somme department

References

Communes of Somme (department)